Sinella is a genus of slender springtails in the family Entomobryidae. There are at least 20 described species in Sinella.

Species

References

Springtail genera